Pauline Mathilde Lucie Auguez de Montalant (28 March 1868 – 18 July 1955) was a French opera singer (light soprano).

Biography

Training 
Auguez was born in Amiens. Her father, Auguste Jules Arsène, was employed by the railway. As a student at the Conservatoire de Paris, she received a third medal for solfège in 1885, a first prize for opéra comique in 1886, a second singing prize in 1887 and a second prize for opéra comique in 1887.

Career 
Her stage debut was in 1887 at the Opéra-Comique. Her first important role, on 29 March 1888, was at that theatre in Madame Turlupin, an opéra comique by Ernest Guiraud, in which she played Isabelle. She then sang in le Baiser de Suzon by Herman Bemberg (premiere, role of Suzon); in Gounod's Mireille and Maillard's Les dragons de Villars. On 30 January 1889, she premiered Louis Varney's la Vénus d'Arles at the Théâtre des Nouveautés. On 11 December 1891, at the Théâtre des Variétés, she was Denise de Flavigny in Hervé's Mam'zelle Nitouche. Later at the Variétés, she played in Offenbach's les Brigands.

In 1894, she gave a song recital at la Bodinière, which earned her this comment in la Caricature: 

Her performances were frequently acclaimed by critics. For example, the Journal amusant wrote in 1910: 

On 10 March 1898, she married journalist and playwright Henri Lavedan. 
Auguez died on 18 July 1955 at her home in the 6th arrondissement of Paris. She is buried with her husband and their daughter Geneviève at Père-Lachaise Cemetery.

References

External links 
 Auguez Mathilde (1868-1955) on Amis et passionnés du Père-Lachaise

1868 births
1955 deaths
People from Amiens
Conservatoire de Paris alumni
French operatic sopranos
Burials at Père Lachaise Cemetery